The 2012 Texas Longhorns volleyball team represented the University of Texas in the 2012 NCAA Division I women's volleyball season. The Texas Longhorns women's volleyball team, led by 12th year head coach Jerritt Elliott, played their home games at Gregory Gymnasium. The Longhorns were members of the Big 12.

The Longhorns won the Big 12 Championship and defeated Oregon 3–0 to win the teams 2nd NCAA Title and 3rd National Title overall.

Roster

Schedule

References

Texas Volleyball
2012 Texas Volleyball
2012 in American sports
Sports teams in Texas
2012 NCAA Division I women's volleyball season